The 2014 Ghana Movie Awards were held at the Accra International Conference Center on 30 December 2014.

Awards
 Actor in a Leading Role
 John Dumelo – Love or Something Like That
 James Gardiner, Eddie Watson, Elikem Kumordzie – Bachelors
 Adjetey Anang – Devil in the Detail
Majid Michel – Family Album
Kwadjo Nkansah (Lilwin) – Made in Agege

 Actress in a Leading Role
 Joselyn Dumas – Love or Something Like That
 Jackie Appiah – Sisters at War
 Kafui Danku – Devil in a Dress
 Ama K. Abrebese – Double-Cross
 Yvonne Nelson – Bachelors

 Actor in a Supporting Role
 Mikki Osei Berko – Potomanto
 Edward Kuffour – When Love Comes Around
Kwaku Manu – Last Word
 Kofi Adjorlolo – Family Album
 Chris Attoh – Single Married & Complicated

 Actress in a Supporting Role
 Sonia Ibrahim – Shattered Romance
 Marie Humbert – Potomanto
 Nana Ama McBrown – Bachelors
 Kasum Sinari – Family Album
 Rose Mensah (Kyeiwaa) – Odo

 Best Actor African Collaboration
 Olu Jacobs – Potomanto
 Okechukwu Ukeje – Love or Something like that
 Jim Iyke – When Love Comes Around
 Alexx Ekubo – Single, Married and Complicated
 Uti Nwachukwu – Devil in a Dress

 Best Actress African Collaboration
 Nse Ikpe Etim – Devil in the Detail
 Eku Edewor – When Love Comes Around
Pierra Makena – When Love Comes Around
 Maria Nepembe – Why Should I Get Married
 Rukky Sanda – If You were Mine

 Directing
 Love or Something Like That – Shirley Frimpong-Manso Sisters at War – Frank Rajah Arase
 Double-Cross – Pascal Aka
 Shattered Romance – Eddie Nartey
 Single, Married and Complicated – Pascal Amanfo

 Editing
 Love or Something Like That – Shirley Frimpong-Manso
 Single Married and Complicated – Okey Benso
 Double-Cross – Pascal Aka
 Family Album – Afla Marley Cinematography
 Double-Cross – Pascal Aka and Prince Dovlo When Love Comes Around – Muyiwa Aluko
 Potomanto – Ken Attoh
 Single Married and Complicated – Tunde Adekoyi
 Why Should I Get Married – Lex Mccarthy

 Best Wardrobe and Costume
 Family Album – Samira Yakubu
 Made in Agege – Bernard Adusie & Kenneth Yeboah
 Single Married & Complicated – Clara Ashantiwaa
 If You Were Mine – Adwoa Asankwa
 Love or Something Like That – Ofelia Crossland & Duaba Serwa Make-Up & Hair Styling
 Love or Something Like That – Selina Asante
 Double-Cross – Nana Ama Atsu Had I Know – Jude Odoi
 Bachelors – Lydia Ashitey
 Made in Agege – Faith Evans

 Music – Original Score
 Single Married & Complicated – Berni Anti Sister at War – Okyeame Kofi
 Why Should I Get Married – DJ Breezy
 If You Were Mine – Seshi Dotse
 Love or Something Like That – Ivan Ayitey & Kofi Boachie – Ansah

 Music - Original Song
 Why did I Get Married – Desmond Blackmore & Jane Awindor Single, Married & Complicated – Berni Anti
 Sisters at War – Okyeame Kofi
 Made in Agege – Ralph kakari

 Best Writing – Original or Adapted Screenplay
 Love or Something Like That – Shirley Frimpong-Manso Single, Married & Complicated – Pascal Amanfo
 Shattered Romance – Eddie Nartey
 Bachelors – Maxwell Akwesi Amuni
 When Love Comes Around – Zynnell Zuh & David Amah

 Best Production Design
 Family Album – Production Design – Pascal Amanfo; Set Decoration – D. J Vegas
 Last Word – Production Design - Abeam Danso; Set Decoration – Abeam Danso
 Potomanto - Production Design – Shirley Frimpong-Manso; Set Decoration – Ken Attoh
 Devil in a Dress – Production Design - Kafui Danku; Set Decoration – Bismark Odoi Sound Mixing & Editing
 Bismark The Joke – Abeam Danso Family Album – Berni Anti
 Potomanto – Shirley Frimpong-Manso

 Discovery of the Year
 Richard Ashanti (Kalybos) – Boys Kasa
 Sammy B – Shattered Romance
 Ahoefe Patricia – Boys Kasa
 Charles Nii Armah Mensah (Shatta Wale) – Never Say Never
 Jane Awindor (Efya) – Why should I Get Married
 Bismarck Odoi – Bachelors

 Best Picture
 Why Should I Get Married – Desmond Blackmore (Producer)
 Love or Something Like That – Ken Attoh, Joselyn Dumas & Shirley Frimpong-Manso (Producers)
 Bachelors – Sallam Abdul (Producer)
 Single, Married & Complicated – Yvonne Nelson (Producer)
 Devil in a Dress – Kafui Danku (Producer)
 Shattered Romance – Juliet Ibrahim (Producer)
 Double-Cross – D.R Kuffour & Ama K. Abebrese (Producers)
 When Love Comes Around – Zynnell Zuh (Producer)
 Family Album – Hajia Hawa Meizongo (Producer) If You Were Mine – Kobi Bartels (Producer)

 Short Movie
 King Agokoli
 Ebola
 Missing Mother
 Ghana Police
 The Adventures kalybos

 TV Series
 High School (GH One)
 Abrabo (UTV)
 Efiewura (Adom TV & TV3)
 Yellow Café (GTV & Afro Star TV)
 Afia Schwarzenegger (Viasat 1)

 TV Series Actress
 Jasmine Baroudi – Heart Break Hotel (TV3)
Gloria Sarfo – Living with Trisha (Viasat 1)
 Maame Boateng – Chorkor Trotro (TV3)
 Ahoefe Patricia – Boys Kasa (TV3 & UTV)
 Victoria Michael – Office palava
 Valentina Nana Agyeiwaa

 TV Series Actor
 Derrick Kobina Boateng – High School (GH One)
 Kojo Nkwansah (Lilwin) – Abrabo (UTV)
 Kwame Djokoto – Efiewura (TV3)
 Prince Yawson – Chorkor Trotro (TV3)
 David Oscar – Peep (TV3)

 Favorite Actor
 Majid Michel
 Prince David Osei
 John Dumelo
 Van Vicker
 Kojo Nkwansah (Lilwin)
 Kwaku Manu
Akwasi Boadi (Akrobeto)
 James Gardiner
 Kofi Adu
 Richard Ashanti (Kalybos)

 Favorite Actress
 Yvonne Nelson
 Jackie Appiah
 Nadia Buari
 Yvonne Okoro
 Maame Serwaa
 Rose Mensah (Kyeiwaa)
 Nana Ama McBrown
 Juliet Ibrahim
Emelia Brobbey
 Rosely Ngissah

References

Ghana Movie Awards
Ghana
2014 in Ghana